Ribar Baikoua (born May 6, 1991, in Poitiers, France) is a French basketball player who plays for French Pro A league club Poitiers.

References

French men's basketball players
1991 births
Sportspeople from Poitiers
Living people